Dougherty is a town in Murray County, Oklahoma, United States. The population was 224 at the 2000 census. American jazz and pop singer Kay Starr was born in Dougherty.

History

The community was first known as Henderson Flat.  On September 3, 1887 a post office was established here and called Dougherty, Indian Territory.  The post office took its new name from banker William Dougherty of Gainesville, Texas.

At the time of its founding, Henderson Flat, later Dougherty, was located in Pickens County, Chickasaw Nation.

As of 1900, Dougherty was a sundown town where African Americans were not allowed to live and could only visit on business in daylight.

Geography
Dougherty is located at  (34.401575, -97.051596).

Demographics

As of the census of 2000, there were 224 people, 96 households, and 60 families residing in the town. There were 115 housing units at an average density of 302.8 per square mile (116.8/km2). The racial makeup of the town was 79.02% White, 0.45% African American, 13.84% Native American, 3.57% from other races, and 3.12% from two or more races. Hispanic or Latino of any race were 3.57% of the population. It is one of the smallest towns in the state.

There were 96 households, out of which 31.3% had children under the age of 18 living with them, 50.0% were married couples living together, 9.4% had a female householder with no husband present, and 36.5% were non-families. 33.3% of all households were made up of individuals, and 16.7% had someone living alone who was 65 years of age or older. The average household size was 2.33 and the average family size was 2.97.

In the town, the population was spread out, with 22.3% under the age of 18, 8.5% from 18 to 24, 30.8% from 25 to 44, 24.1% from 45 to 64, and 14.3% who were 65 years of age or older. The median age was 38 years. For every 100 females, there were 109.3 males. For every 100 females age 18 and over, there were 109.6 males.

The median income for a household in the town was $23,000, and the median income for a family was $33,125. Males had a median income of $16,042 versus $16,875 for females. The per capita income for the town was $14,490. About 13.2% of families and 20.1% of the population were below the poverty line, including 26.5% of those under the age of eighteen and 30.6% of those 65 or over.

Notable person
 Kay Starr, singer, was born in Dougherty.

References

External links
 Encyclopedia of Oklahoma History and Culture - Dougherty

Towns in Murray County, Oklahoma
Towns in Oklahoma
Sundown towns in Oklahoma